Sittin' In is a 1957 studio album by Dizzy Gillespie, featuring the saxophonists Stan Getz, Paul Gonsalves and Coleman Hawkins.

Track listing
 "Dizzy Atmosphere" (Dizzy Gillespie) – 10:57
 "I'm Thru' with Love"/"Without a Word of Warning"/"Sweet Lorraine"/"Love Walked In"/"September Song" (Gus Kahn, Fud Livingston, Matty Malneck)/(Mack Gordon, Harry Revel)/(Cliff Burwell, Mitchell Parish)/(George Gershwin, Ira Gershwin)/(Kurt Weill, Maxwell Anderson) – 11:00
 "On the Alamo"/"Stompin' at the Savoy"/"This Time the Dream's on Me"/"Time After Time"/"Gone with the Wind" (Kahn, Isham Jones)/(Edgar Sampson, Benny Goodman, Chick Webb, Andy Razaf)/(Harold Arlen, Johnny Mercer)/(Sammy Cahn, Jule Styne)/(Herb Magidson, Allie Wrubel) – 12:29
 "The Way You Look Tonight" (Jerome Kern, Dorothy Fields) – 13:38

Personnel
Dizzy Gillespie – trumpet
Stan Getz – tenor saxophone
Paul Gonsalves – tenor saxophone
Coleman Hawkins – tenor saxophone
Wynton Kelly – piano
Wendell Marshall – double bass
J.C. Heard – drums

References 

1957 albums
Dizzy Gillespie albums
Albums produced by Norman Granz
Verve Records albums